Janni Bach (born 28 April 1966) is a Danish-born, former Australian female handball player. She played handball from the age of five, made her Denmark junior women's national handball team debut at age 17, and was chosen for the Denmark women's national handball team in 1991. In 1997, her husband Peter—also a handball player—was offered a job in Australia, and the family relocated. Within weeks of arriving, both were recruited for the Australia women's national handball team and the Australia men's national handball team, respectively. Bach was part of the team at the 2000 Summer Olympics, playing five matches. On club level she played for Roskilde Håndbold in Denmark, and University of Sydney in Australia.

Bach's son, Rasmus, is a professional basketball player.

References 

Living people
Handball players at the 2000 Summer Olympics
1966 births
Australian female handball players
Olympic handball players of Australia
Handball players from Copenhagen
Danish emigrants to Australia
Australian people of Danish descent